Ia Orana Maria (Ave Maria) is an 1891 oil on canvas painting by Paul Gauguin, now in the  Metropolitan Museum of Art in New York. It is one of the first works in his Tahitian period and shows two Polynesians (centre) greeting the Madonna and Child.

References

See also
List of paintings by Paul Gauguin

1891 paintings
Paintings in the collection of the Metropolitan Museum of Art
Paintings by Paul Gauguin
Paintings of the Madonna and Child